Giorgi Papunashvili (born 3 August 1991) is a Georgian judoka.

He is the silver medallist of the 2018 Judo Grand Prix Tbilisi in the -90 kg category.

References

External links
 

1991 births
Living people
Male judoka from Georgia (country)
21st-century people from Georgia (country)